Parornix boreasella is a moth of the family Gracillariidae. It is known from Labrador and Québec in Canada and Pennsylvania in the United States.

The larvae feed on Betula lenta and Betula nigra. They mine the leaves of their host plant.

References

Parornix
Moths of North America
Moths described in 1864